Events in the year 2023 in Samoa.

Incumbents 

 O le Ao o le Malo: Va'aletoa Sualauvi II
 Prime Minister: Fiamē Naomi Mataʻafa

Events 
Ongoing – COVID-19 pandemic in Samoa

Scheduled

 24 February – 2023 Vaimauga 3 by-election

Sports 

 2023 Super Rugby Pacific season

References 

 
2020s in Samoa
Years of the 21st century in Samoa
Samoa
Samoa